Air Marshal Sir Donald Percy Hall,  (11 November 1930 – 12 January 1999) was a Royal Air Force officer who served as Deputy Chief of Defence Staff (Systems) from 1983 to 1986.

Flying career
Educated at Hull Grammar School and the Royal Air Force College Cranwell, Hall was commissioned into the Royal Air Force in 1952. He became Officer Commanding No. 111 Squadron in 1966. He went on to be Junior Members Co-ordinator at the Imperial Defence College in 1968, Officer Commanding the Empire Test Pilots' School in 1971 and Station Commander of RAF Akrotiri in 1973. After that, he became Senior Air Staff Officer at Headquarters No. 11 Group in 1975, Air Officer Commanding No. 11 Group in March 1977 and Assistant Chief of the Air Staff (Operational Requirements) in September 1977. He went on to be Air Officer Commanding No. 38 Group in 1980 and Deputy Chief of the Defence Staff (Systems) in 1983 before retiring in 1986.

In retirement he became Deputy Chairman of GEC-Marconi.

Family
In 1953 he married Joyce Warburton; they had two daughters, Melanie and Jilly.

References

|-

|-

1930 births
1999 deaths
Royal Air Force air marshals
People educated at Hull Grammar School
Military personnel from Kingston upon Hull
Knights Commander of the Order of the Bath
Commanders of the Order of the British Empire
Recipients of the Air Force Cross (United Kingdom)
Graduates of the Royal Air Force College Cranwell